Grégory Berthier (born 11 November 1995) is a French professional footballer who plays as a winger for  club Orléans.

Career
Berthier made his professional debut with AJ Auxerre in August 2014, in a 1–0 Ligue 2 defeat against Dijon.

In June 2015, it was announced Berthier would join Stade de Reims for the 2015–16 having signed a four-year contract. He helped Stade de Reims win the 2017–18 Ligue 2, helping promote them to the Ligue 1 for the 2018–19 season.

On 6 October 2020, it was confirmed, that Berthier had joined Danish 1st Division club Vendsyssel FF. On 1 July 2021, Berthier returned to France, signing with Chambly.

In June 2022, Berthier signed with Orléans.

Honours
Reims
 Ligue 2: 2017–18

References

External links
 
 
 Grégory Berthier foot-national.com Profile

1995 births
Living people
Sportspeople from Sens
Association football wingers
French footballers
French expatriate footballers
Ligue 2 players
Championnat National players
Championnat National 2 players
Championnat National 3 players
Danish 1st Division players
AJ Auxerre players
Stade de Reims players
Red Star F.C. players
Vendsyssel FF players
FC Chambly Oise players
US Orléans players
French expatriate sportspeople in Denmark
Expatriate men's footballers in Denmark